Becquerelia may refer to:
 Becquerelia (insect), a genus of fossil insects in the family Spilapteridae
 Becquerelia (plant), a genus of plants in the family Cyperaceae